Mahmudabad (also Romanized as Maḩmūdābād; also known as Maḩmūdābād-e Sheykh ‘Os̄mān) is a village in Razab Rural District, in the Central District of Sarvabad County, Kurdistan Province, Iran. At the 2006 census, its population was 14, in 4 families. The village is populated by Kurds.

References 

Towns and villages in Sarvabad County
Kurdish settlements in Kurdistan Province